Stewart Lynn "Smokey" Stover (born August 24, 1938) is an American former gridiron football player.  He played College football at Northeast Louisiana State College—now known as the University of Louisiana at Monroe—as a fullback and professionally in the American Football League (AFL) and the Canadian Football League (CFL) as a linebacker.

Stover was raised in Oilton, Oklahoma and Vidaway, Oklahoma, and attended a military high school in Claremore, Oklahoma.  He played football at Murray State College in Tishomingo, Oklahoma and at the University of Louisiana at Monroe, where he was later elected to first class of the school's hall of fame in 1978.

When he was signed in 1960 as an original Dallas Texan in the American Football League, head coach Hank Stram converted him to a linebacker.  He played for the Texans in their classic double-overtime victory over the two-time defending AFL Champion Houston Oilers in 1962, and for the Kansas City Chiefs when they won the 1966 AFL title, once again over a two-time defending AFL Champion, this time the Buffalo Bills, and played in the first AFL-NFL World Championship game.  After leaving the Chiefs following the 1966 AFL season, Stover played for the Canadian Football League's Hamilton Tiger-Cats, winning the Grey Cup with them in 1967.  After his football career, he moved to Lafayette, Louisiana.

See also
 List of American Football League players

References

1938 births
Living people
American football fullbacks
American football linebackers
American players of Canadian football
Canadian football linebackers
Dallas Texans (AFL) players
Hamilton Tiger-Cats players
Kansas City Chiefs players
Louisiana–Monroe Warhawks football players
People from Creek County, Oklahoma
People from McPherson, Kansas
People from Seminole, Oklahoma
Players of American football from Oklahoma
American Football League players